Thumi is a village development committee in Gorkha District in the Gandaki Zone of northern-central Nepal. At the time of the 1991 Nepal census it had a population of 3,690 and had 727 houses.

References

Populated places in Gorkha District